Holmdel Park is located in Holmdel Township, New Jersey and is part of the Monmouth County Park System. The initial park land was established in 1962, with an additional 
section added in 2001.
Holmdel Park is also the home of the Holmdel Arboretum; aka David C.
Shaw Arboretum and the Longstreet Farm, a living history farm set in the 1890s.
The park is a popular destination for local elementary school trips and cross-country runners.

In August 2017 it was announced that a further  was being donated. In 2018, it obtained an additional 52 acres of land.

Activities and facilities
The park's recreational offerings include fishing (with permit), individual and group
picnic areas, tennis courts, playgrounds and 10 miles of hiking trails. Ice skating
and sledding are permitted when conditions are deemed safe.

The park contains four distinct visitor areas, each with its own parking; three are accessed
via the main park entrance while the fourth is located at the activity center further north
on Longstreet Road.

The Pond View area provides access to the arboretum,
Historic Longstreet Farm, Upper and Lower ponds and the shelter building; the shelter building also houses
a seasonal concession. The Forest Ridge area provides access to group picnic areas, trails
and activity fields; the Forest Ridge parking lot also acts as an overflow lot
for the Pond View area. The Hill Top area as the name implies is located at the
top of a fairly steep hill; this area provides parking for the parks tennis courts as well
as access to additional trails. The Activity Center provides indoor facilities for scheduled county sponsored activities.

Historic Longstreet Farm

Historic Longstreet Farm is a living history farm that recreates agricultural life of the 1890s. Interpreters dress in period clothing and perform typical year round farming and domestic activities, including seasonal planting and harvesting of crops and raising livestock. The farm is listed on the National Register of Historic Places.
The farm was purchased by the Monmouth County Park System in 1967 to preserve the county's rural past. The farm opened to the public in 1972 as Historic Longstreet Farm.

Historic Longstreet Farm is a fairly complete example of a typical nineteenth-century farm created by Dutch settlers in New Jersey. The farmstead consists of a 14-room Federal-style farmhouse, a Dutch barn, and a collection of nineteenth-century farm outbuildings.

Historic Longstreet Farm is open daily year round, free of charge.

David C. Shaw Arboretum
The David C. Shaw Arboretum is a  horticultural display created by the Monmouth County Shade Tree Commission. The arboretum was created in 1963 and is named for a former superintendent. The arboretum initially started with 87 trees but now boasts nearly 3000 specimens.

Trails
The park hosts a dozen trails of varying lengths and difficulties.

North Section

Hilltop
 Cross Country Trail 3.1 miles (5 km)
 High Point Trail 0.6 mile (1 km) loop

Marsh
 Marsh Trail 0.8 mile (1.3 km) features long boardwalks over marshy areas and trails for wildlife viewing

Hill
 Beech Glen 0.5 mile (0.8 km)
 Ridge Walk 1.2 mile (1.9 km) loop
 Fitness trail 0.8 mile (1.3 km)

Plain
 Paved Trail 0.5 mile (0.8 km) circles the field between the Longstreet Farm, the Upper and Lower Ponds, and picnic areas. 
 Pond Walk 0.4 mile (0.6 km) circles the Lower Pond.

Ramanessin Section
 Ramanessin Trail 2.1 miles (3.3 km)
 Steeplechase Trail 1.4 mile (2.2 km)
The Homestead  and Fern trails provide short (0.25 mile (0.4 km)) connections between the above two trails

References

External links
 Holmdel Park (County Park System)
Historic Longstreet Farm (County Park System)
Longstreet Farm History (County Park System)
Holmdel Park trails map

Monmouth County Park System
Holmdel Township, New Jersey
1962 establishments in New Jersey
National Register of Historic Places in Monmouth County, New Jersey
Historic farms in the United States
Historic house museums in New Jersey
Farms in New Jersey
Dutch-American culture in New Jersey